Alan Arthur Hurst (2 September 1945 – 31 January 2023) was a British solicitor and Labour politician who served as Member of Parliament (MP) for Braintree in Essex from 1997 to 2005.

Early life
Hurst was the son of George Hurst. He attended Westcliff High School for Boys in Westcliff-on-Sea. From the University of Liverpool, he gained a BA in History.

Before being elected an MP, he had been deputy leader of Southend-on-Sea Council, joining the council in 1968. He continued to practise part-time as a solicitor while an MP. In 1993, he was elected to Essex County Council for the Orsett & Stifford division.

Parliamentary career
At the 1997 general election, he caused a stir by overturning Tony Newton's majority of 17,494, with a majority of 1,494; Braintree had been Conservative since the 1955 election. Almost as surprising (though not with hindsight, since the Tories made next to no progress nationally in 2001) was his holding the seat at the 2001 general election, though this time with a majority of 358, making it Labour's second-most marginal victory at that election and the sixth-most overall. He lost the seat in the 2005 general election to Brooks Newmark of the Conservative Party.

Hurst never held government office, remaining a backbencher. He served on the select committee for agriculture for a time (including during the 2001 foot and mouth crisis) and then on the Speaker's Panel. He occasionally rebelled against the government, often on judicial issues, though not on any high-profile issues or as part of any major rebellions, with the exception of supporting an amendment to the top-up fees bill (Higher Education Act 2004) which would have removed such fees from the bill whilst maintaining other aspects of it, an attempt to have the bill's increased funding for universities without higher fees (presumably by putting up the basic or higher rate of income tax or introducing a graduate tax); the government claimed that the greater funding (almost, though not quite, universally accepted to be necessary) could only be achieved with top-up fees, so the choice was fees or continuing underfunding, but many saw this as a false dichotomy imposed by the government (which had pledged not to raise income tax – indeed, had cut it in its first term – and had already raised National Insurance contributions once, though this move was very popular) to hold funding hostage, as it were, and ensure the bill's passing. This rebellion was not overly important, as the much larger rebellion on the bill's second reading had already failed (by a mere five votes). He did vote for a total ban on hunting with dogs when the government was proposing mere restriction, but this was not, strictly speaking, a rebellion as it was a free vote.

Personal life
Hurst married Hilary Burch in 1976. They had two sons and a daughter.

Hurst died on 31 January 2023 at the age of 77.

References

External links
 They Work For You
 Ask Aristotle

1945 births
2023 deaths
Labour Party (UK) MPs for English constituencies
People educated at Westcliff High School for Boys
UK MPs 1997–2001
UK MPs 2001–2005
Alumni of the University of Liverpool
English solicitors
Labour Party (UK) councillors
Members of Essex County Council
Place of birth missing
Place of death missing